Capuronia is a genus of flowering plants belonging to the family Lythraceae.

Its native range is Madagascar.

Species:
 Capuronia benoistii (Leandri) P.E.Berry

References

Lythraceae
Lythraceae genera